68 Aquilae (abbreviated 68 Aql) is a double star in the equatorial constellation of Aquila. 68 Aquilae is its Flamsteed designation. Its apparent magnitude is 6.12.

References

External links
 HR 7821
 Image 68 Aquilae

B-type main-sequence stars
Double stars
Aquila (constellation)
Durchmusterung objects
Aquilae, 68
194939
100977
7821